Amenmose was an ancient Egyptian vizier, who served during the reign of Amenmesse and Seti II.

References

Ancient Egyptian viziers
Nineteenth Dynasty of Egypt